Nathalie is a female given name. It is a variant of the name Natalie/Natalia which is found in many languages, and is especially common in French and English speaking countries.

Notable people with the name include:
 Nathalie, Italian singer
 Nathalie Baye, French actress
 Nathalie Boltt, South African actress
 Nathalie Carrasco, French chemist and professor of astronomy and astrophysics
 Nathalie Dechy, French former tennis player
 Nathalie Delon (1941–2021), French actress and film director
 Nathalie Doummar, Canadian playwright and actress
 Nathalie Eisenbaum, French mathematician
 Nathalie Emmanuel, British actress
 Nathalie Kelley, Peruvian-Australian actress
 Nathalie Lahdenmäki, Finnish ceramic artist and designer
 Nathalie Schenck Laimbeer, American banker
 Nathalie Lind (1918–1999), Danish politician
 Nathalie Loriers, Belgian jazz pianist and composer
 Nathalie Lupino, French judoka
 Nathalie Makoma, Dutch singer, runner-up in the Dutch TV series Idols 4
 Nathalie Matar, Lebanese footballer
 Nathalie Palanque-Delabrouille, French astrophysicist, cosmologist
 Nathalie Paulding, American actress
 Nathalie Roussel, French actress
 Nathalie Simard, Canadian singer
 Nathalie Sarraute, Russian-born French writer
 Nathalie Stutzmann, French contralto and conductor
 Nathalie Tauziat, French former tennis player
 Nathalie Vierin, Italian tennis player
 Natalie Zahle, Danish reform pedagogue

See also
 Natalie (given name)
 Natalia (given name)
 Natasha

English feminine given names
Arabic feminine given names
Dutch feminine given names
French feminine given names
Feminine given names